Abakan International Airport is an airport located in Abakan, Republic of Khakassia, Russia.

The airport is located to the north of the city not far from the city limits. City bus and trolleybus connections are available. It is the only airport in the region (Khakassia and south of Krasnoyarsk Kray) suitable for all types of aircraft.

History 
On 1 March 1993, the PI “Abakan Airport” was established as independent enterprise by standing out of Abakan Aviation Enterprise; the Public Property Management Committee in cooperation with the Transport Aviation Department and Council of Ministers of Republic of Khakassia adopted this decision. By 1993, the Transport Aviation Department together with the Government of the Republic succeeded to perform a significant preparatory workload for the international sector and finally, to achieve the international airport statute. In 1996, the “Abakan Airport” OJSK was established. In 1999 and 2000, the Abakan Airport won the competition “The Best Airport of the CIS countries” carried out by the “Airport” Association.

Airlines and destinations

Passenger

Cargo

Accidents and incidents

On 7 March 1965, an Aeroflot Li-2 operating as Aeroflot Flight 542 (Abakan to Kyzyl) crashed shortly after takeoff from Abakan.

On 27 November 1996, 8 minutes after taking off from Abakan Airport, an Ilyushin Il-76 transport aircraft (registered RA-78804) crashed into a mountain near Minusinsk on the right bank of Yenisey river. The aircraft transported consumer goods and food. Everyone on board (23 people, including 13 passengers) died. The cause of the crash was that the aircraft was overloaded and climbed very slowly.

References

External links

  Abakan International Airport

Airports in Khakassia
Abakan